The district of Deutsch Krone (German: Landkreis Deutsch Krone) was a district in Prussia from 1772 to 1945. It belonged to the part of West Prussia that remained in the German Reich after World War I and became part of the Province of Grenzmark Posen-West Prussia. From 1938 to 1945, it belonged to the Province of Pomerania. Today the territory of the district area lies in the Polish Voivodeships of West Pomerania and Greater Poland.

History 
The Deutsch Krone district became part of the Kingdom of Prussia after the First Partition of Poland in 1772. Through the Treaty of Tilsit, the southern part of the district with the towns of Filehne, Schönlanke and Schneidemühl fell to the Duchy of Warsaw in 1807. As part of the Prussian administrative reforms, on April 30, 1815, the district became part of the new administrative region of Marienwerder in the province of West Prussia. Several exclaves were mutually exchanged with the neighboring district of Dramburg in the northwest. After the final determination of the new district boundaries in the Marienwerder region, the Deutsch Krone district comprised the towns of Deutsch Krone, Jastrow, Märkisch Friedland, Schloppe and Tütz. The seat of the district office was in the town of Deutsch Krone.

From December 3, 1829 to April 1, 1878, West Prussia and East Prussia were united to form the Province of Prussia, which had belonged to the German Reich since January 1871. In contrast to most of the other West Prussian districts, the predominantly German-populated district of Deutsch Krone remained in Germany after World War I. On November 20, 1919, the district was subordinated to the new administrative region of Grenzmark West Prussia-Posen with its seat in Schneidemühl. On January 11, 1921, the administrative region of "Grenzmark West Prussia-Posen" was renamed "Grenzmark Posen-West Prussia". On July 1, 1922, the new province of Grenzmark Posen-West Prussia was formed from the administrative region. The new administrative region of Schneidemühl was formed on August 1, 1922, which was congruent to the province. On October 1, 1938, after the dissolution of the Province of Grenzmark Posen-West Prussia, the Deutsch Krone district was incorporated into the Province of Pomerania. For reasons of tradition, the administrative region of Schneidemühl was given the name "Grenzmark Posen-West Prussia".

In the spring of 1945, the area of the Deutsch Krone district was occupied by the Red Army. After the end of World War II, the district was placed under Polish administration by the Soviets in the summer of 1945 in accordance with the Potsdam Agreement. In the following years, the German population was expelled and was replaced by Poles, most of whom came from the Kresy.

Demographics 
The district had a mostly German population with a small Polish minority.

Elections 
In the German Empire, the Deutsch Krone district formed the Marienwerder 8 Reichstag constituency. The constituency was won by national liberal or conservative candidates in all Reichstag elections: 
 1871: Franz Adolph Guenther, Free Conservative Party
 1874: Friedrich Lehr, National Liberal Party
 1877: Friedrich Lehr, National Liberal Party
 1878: Theodor zu Stolberg-Wernigerode, German Conservative Party
 1881: Max von Brauchitsch, German Conservative Party
 1884: Karl von Gamp-Massaunen, Free Conservative Party
 1887: Karl von Gamp-Massaunen, Free Conservative Party
 1890: Karl von Gamp-Massaunen, Free Conservative Party
 1893: Karl von Gamp-Massaunen, Free Conservative Party
 1898: Karl von Gamp-Massaunen, Free Conservative Party
 1903: Karl von Gamp-Massaunen, Free Conservative Party
 1907: Karl von Gamp-Massaunen, Free Conservative Party
 1912: Karl von Gamp-Massaunen, Free Conservative Party

Municipalities 
At the end of its existence in 1945, the district contained 5 towns and 92 other municipalities.

Transportation 
The first rail connection in the district was established in 1879 on the Schneidemühl - Jastrow - Neustettin line of the Prussian Eastern Railway. Then in 1881, the Prussian State Railroad reached the district town Deutsch Krone from Schneidemühl and then in 1888, the junction of Kallies in the district of Dramburg.

After the town of Märkisch Friedland in the west of the district was connected to the Kallies - Falkenburg route in 1900, the Tempelburg - Jastrow line followed in the north in 1908, which was extended to Flatow in 1914. At the same time, the Deutsch Krone - Plietnitz - Flatow line also went into operation.

Before that, the Deutsch Krone district had built two small railways of its own, starting from the district town:
 1898 from Westbahnhof to Virchow in the Dramburg district and
 1904 from the Südbahnhof to Schloppe, where as early as 1899 the line continued to Kreuz. This created a rail network of length 220 km, 63 km of which belonged to the district.

The former Reichsstrasse 1 (Aachen - Eydtkuhnen) ran through Deutsch Krone.

References 

Populated places disestablished in 1945
1772 establishments in Prussia
1945 disestablishments in Germany
Wałcz County
Districts of West Prussia
Posen-West Prussia
Province of Pomerania (1815–1945)